Mzuzu United Football Club is a Malawian football (soccer) club based in Mzuzu that currently plays in the Northern Region Football League, the second division of Malawian football.

Stadium
Currently the team plays at the 10000 capacity Mzuzu Stadium.

Honours
Northern Region Football League
Winners (1): 2012–13

References

External links

Football clubs in Malawi